Quercus persica is a species of flowering plant in the beech family Fagaceae, native to western Iran. It was first described in 1843. It has been treated as a subspecies of Quercus brantii. It is placed in section Cerris.

References

persica
Flora of Iran
Plants described in 1843